Gautam Sarkar, also spelt as Goutam Sarkar, and known by the nickname "Indian Beckenbauer" (born 8 January 1950), is a former Indian Bengali international footballer and football coach from West Bengal. He completed his schooling from Baranagore Ramakrishna Mission Ashrama High School. He played for East Bengal Club and captained the team in 1976–77. Sarkar began his club football career in Kidderpore SC, and also played for Aryans. He was awarded Banga Bhushan by the Government of West Bengal in 2014.

Honours
East Bengal
IFA Shield: 1974, 1975

Mohun Bagan
Federation Cup: 1978–79, 1980–81

See also 
 Banga Bhushan
 List of SC East Bengal captains

References

External links
 A soccer great's rare double, Telegraph, 28 August, 1982

Baranagore Ramakrishna Mission Ashrama High School alumni
Bengali Hindus
Ramakrishna Mission schools alumni
1950 births
Living people
Indian footballers
India international footballers
Footballers from Kolkata
East Bengal Club players
Mohun Bagan AC players
Aryan FC players
Association football midfielders
Asian Games competitors for India
Footballers at the 1974 Asian Games